Serena Williams was the two-time defending champion, but lost in the second round to Jana Čepelová, ending her 15-match winning streak at this tournament, and her 28-match winning streak on clay.

Andrea Petkovic won the title, defeating Čepelová in the final, 7–5, 6–2.

This was the last WTA tournament that former World No. 3 and two-time French Open semifinalist Nadia Petrova competed in. Having been awarded a wild card into the main draw, she was beaten by Marina Erakovic in the first round.

Seeds
The top eight seeds received a bye into the second round.

  Serena Williams (second round)
  Jelena Janković (quarterfinals)
  Sara Errani (quarterfinals)
  Sabine Lisicki (third round)
  Sloane Stephens (second round)
  Eugenie Bouchard (semifinals)
  Samantha Stosur (third round)
  Sorana Cîrstea (second round)
  Lucie Šafářová (quarterfinals)
  Maria Kirilenko (first round)
  Venus Williams (third round)
  Daniela Hantuchová (quarterfinals)
  Elena Vesnina (third round)
  Andrea Petkovic (champion)
  Madison Keys (second round)
  Zhang Shuai (second round)

Draw

Finals

Top half

Section 1

Section 2

Bottom half

Section 3

Section 4

Qualifying

Seeds

Qualifiers

Qualifying draw

First qualifier

Second qualifier

Third qualifier

Fourth qualifier

Fifth qualifier

Sixth qualifier

Seventh qualifier

Eighth qualifier

References

 Main Draw
 Qualifying Draw

2014 WTA Tour
2014 Singles